Gobi Corporation (Mongolian: ГОВЬ ХК) is a Mongolian cashmere manufacturer co-headquartered in Ulaanbaatar, Mongolia.

Gobi was opened officially after installing cashmere and camel wool processing machinery and completed its adjustments in 1981. Since it started operating, Gobi has become one of the five biggest vertically integrated manufacturers specialising in cashmere, camel wool, and yak down products in the world. After operating almost 30 years as a government-owned company, Gobi started a fresh chapter in July 2007. The government-owned stake was sold and it started manufacturing under private owners.

Gobi has official six branch stores located in Berlin, Hamburg, Düsseldorf, Tokyo, Los Angeles, Hong Kong, and Erlian, and 62 franchise stores in globally.

History
Gobi opened officially after installing cashmere and camel wool processing machinery, completing its adjustments in 1981. The company's name refers to the Gobi Desert, a unique natural landscape that is the habitat of rare animals and plants. It is also the main area where the majority of raw cashmere is sourced from.

Within UNIDO project implementation, a cashmere and camel wool processing experimental factory was opened. For three months, 78 engineers were trained in Japan to learn how to process cashmere and camel wool and operate factory machinery.

State-owned Gobi Company was privatized under the legal name FCI LLC in July 2007. 

In 2012, the mineral boom in Mongolia drove up the cost of Gobi's production.

As of 2019, Gobi corporation has around 3,000 employees. In September 2019, the company announced the opening of a US office in Los Angeles and an e-commerce website catering exclusively to US customers. Following the COVID-19 crisis and the drop in cashmere sales, Gobi Cashmere laid off 10% of its workforce.

Description 
Gobi Corporation sold 12,000 pieces of 100% cashmere cardigan in 60 minutes, 800 bits of 100% reverse coat in 17 minutes, and 4,000 pieces of cashmere knit shawl in 18 minutes on Hyundai Home Shopping in Korean market.

Gobi Corporation owns the title of "The World's Largest Cashmere Store"  with a 2,500 sqm cashmere shopping store in Galleria Ulaanbaatar Mall located in next to Mongolian Parliament Building Ulaanbaatar, Mongolia.

Gobi factory lines deliver over 1.1 million meters of cashmere-woven material, 162,000 pieces of tailored sewn products, and 1.5 million knitted products per a year. Gobi Cashmere supplies both domestically and globally.

Mr Baatarsaikhan has served as president of Gobi Cashmere since 1995. Previously, he was the chief executive officer of Gobi JSC and was instrumental in turning the former state-owned cashmere company into the largest cashmere manufacturer in Mongolia.

Gallery

References 

Textile companies of Mongolia
Woollen mills
Companies based in Ulaanbaatar
Manufacturing companies established in 1981
1980s establishments in Mongolia
1981 establishments in Asia
1981 establishments in the Soviet Union
Cashmere wool